Alfred Edward Quantrill (22 January 1897 – 19 April 1968) was an English footballer. Born in Rawalpindi, Punjab, British India where his father was based on military service, he played on either wing and appeared four times for the England national team.

Quantrill played non-league football for Boston Swifts until being signed by Derby County in 1914. Quantrill helped Derby gain promotion to Division One in his first season at the club, but his career was soon interrupted by the First World War. He served as a member of the Derbyshire Yeomanry, but was sent home after developing malaria in Salonika.

Quantrill returned to health and retained his place in the Derby team when league football resumed. In March 1920 he made his debut for England against Wales, a 2–1 defeat. He went on to win four caps, scoring once, in the 5–4 win at home to Scotland.

In 1921 Quantrill was transferred to Preston North End, playing in a forward line also including Tommy Roberts, Rowland Woodhouse and Archie Rawlings. He made  his debut on 27 August 1921 in a 2–2 draw away to Bolton Wanderers. Quantrill played in 64 games for Preston before leaving in 1923 to join Bradford Park Avenue. He later moved to Nottingham Forest in August 1930 where he finished his league career in April 1932.

Personal life
Quantrill was married to Hetty Winifred Bloomer, the eldest daughter of former England international Steve Bloomer and had two children. He served as a private in the Derbyshire Yeomanry during the First World War.

See also
 List of England international footballers born outside England

References

1897 births
English footballers
Derby County F.C. players
Preston North End F.C. players
Chorley F.C. players
Bradford (Park Avenue) A.F.C. players
Nottingham Forest F.C. players
1968 deaths
England international footballers
Footballers from Rawalpindi
Association football outside forwards
British Army personnel of World War I
Derbyshire Yeomanry soldiers
British people in colonial India